János Erdélyi (1 April 1814 in Nagykapos – 23 January 1868 in Sárospatak) was a Hungarian poet, critic, author, philosopher and ethnographist.

He was born in 1814 at Nagykapos, in the county of Ung, and educated at the Protestant college of Sárospatak. In 1833 he removed to Pest, where he was, in 1839, elected member of the Hungarian Academy of Sciences. He began his literary career with poems written in folk style (published in 1844).

His literary fame was made by his collection of Hungarian national poems and folk-tales, Magyar népköltési gyűjtemény, népdalok és mondák ("Collection of Hungarian Folklore, Folk Songs and Tales", Pest, 1846–1847). This work, published by the Kisfaludy Society, was supplemented his ilnon Hiinaarian national ooetrv  afterwards partially translated into German by Stier (Berlin, 1851). Erdélyi also compiled for the Kisfaludy Society an extensive collection of Hungarian proverbs Magyar közmondások könyve ("Book of Hungarian Proverbs", Pest, 1851), and was for some time editor of the Szépirodalmi Szemle ("Review of Polite Literature"). In 1848 he was appointed director of the national theatre at Pest; but after 1849 he resided at his native town. He died on 23 January 1868. A collection of folklore was published the year after his death, entitled A nép költészete: népdalok, népmesék és közmondások ("Poetry of the People: Folk Songs, Tales and Proverbs", Pest, 1869). This work contains 300 national songs, 19 folk-tales and 7362 Hungarian proverbs.

As a philosopher he was an utopian socialist, influenced by Hegel.

Quotes
 "It was said that education harms folk poetry, and it's true, but should we curse the Sun for banishing the dawn?" (Mondatott: a műveltség árt a népköltészetnek, s ez igaz, de miért átkoznók a napot, hogy a hajnalt elűzi egünkről.)

References

External links
 
  
 A picture

Hungarian male poets
Members of the Hungarian Academy of Sciences
1814 births
1868 deaths
19th-century Hungarian poets
19th-century Hungarian male writers